Auwers is a small lunar impact crater located in the Montes Haemus mountain range at the south edge of Mare Serenitatis. It is named after German astronomer Arthur Auwers. It lies southeast of the crater Menelaus. The irregular rim of Auwers has a gap at the north-northwest edge, which allowed lava flows to reach the crater floor and flood the interior.

Satellite craters

By convention these features are identified on lunar maps by placing the letter on the side of the crater midpoint that is closest to Auwers.

References

External links

 LTO-60A2 Auwers — L&PI topographic map

Impact craters on the Moon